Jodia sericea is a moth of the family Noctuidae. It is found in China, Japan (Hokkaido, Honshu, Shikoku), the Russian Far East (Primorye, Khabarovsk, Amur region) and the Korean Peninsula.

External links
Insects of Korea
Images

Cuculliinae
Moths of Japan
Moths described in 1878